Anu Namshir born April 12, 1991, is a Mongolian  model, graphic designer and beauty pageant titleholder who represented Mongolia at the Miss International 2013, Miss Manzhouli 2014, World Bikini Model 2015, Asian Star Model 2015 Supermodel International 2015, Miss World 2015, Miss Tourism Queen International 2016 pageant. She won the Miss Mongolia 2013 title and was later crowned as World Bikini Model International 2014 (1st runner up) and Miss Manzhouli 2014 (winner) in China, Asian Star Model 2015 Supermodel International 2015 (winner) in Korea and Miss World Mongolia 2015 (national winner). And then she represented Mongolia in the Miss World 2015. On September 26, 2016, she was crowned Miss Tourism Queen International 2016 and awarded Miss Charity. And then December 1, 2016, she has participated first in Goyol 2017 which was organized by Mongolian Designers Association annually was awarded "Photo Model". She worked at Mongolia's Next Top Model show 14th number representing Z24 online ticket reservation through Z24 face.

Modeling career

Miss Mongolia 2013
Anu participated Miss Mongolia 2013 beauty pageant competition when she was student. She was crowned Miss Mongolia on September 14, 2013, at the State Academic Theatre of Drama. This competition was aired on MNB. She represented Mongolia in the Miss International 2013 in Japan.

Miss World Mongolia 2015
Anu competed in the Miss World Mongolia 2015 pageant and was the winner of the national pageant and delegate for Mongolia in the Miss World 2015 competition.  via a TV reality show that concluded on July 5 at the State Academic Theater of Opera and Ballet, Ulaanbaatar. This beauty pageant competition was aired on MNC television. She represented Mongolia in the Miss World 2015 pageant held in Sanya, Hainan Island, China PR. In October, 2016 she passed her crown on to next national winner A. Bayartsetseg during the winner's ceremony.
Anu has the talent to paint portraits by her lips. She first painted for 'Miss talent' in the Miss Mongolia 2013 and then painted by her lips for 'Miss talent' in the Miss World 2015 too.  She put on art exhibition which was named 'Charity kiss art event'on September 18, 2015, at the 'Q Art Gallerie'in Ulaanbaatar for 'Beauty with a purpose' in Miss World 2015.  During 'Charity kiss art event', she screened famous people's portraits such as Genghis Khan, Michael Jackson, Marilyn Monroe ... etc. She donated to low standard of living children for their education her all income from the art exhibition. And she created and give video lesson about sexual maturity for adolescence.

Miss World 2015
She represented Mongolia in the Miss World 2015, the 65th edition of the Miss World pageant, was held on 19 December 2015 at the Crown of Beauty Theatre, Sanya, China. 114 contestants from all over the world competed for the crown. During the pageant, her dress became one of the top 10 designer dresses which was made by Tserenlkhagva who is a designer at Precious Fashion House. and she was invited to put on her exhibition which her portraits that painted by her lips in London. She also became one of the best 25 beauty of purpose miss.

Miss Tourism Queen International 2016
She participated representing Mongolia in the Miss Tourism Queen International 2016. The beauty pageant continued from 12 September to 26 September 2016. At the conclusion of the finale of Miss Tourism Queen International 2016 held on 26 September 2016 at Wenzhou, China, Namshir was crowned as the winner. She succeeds Kantapat Peeradachainarin from Thailand as the new Miss Tourism Queen International 2016, and battled out 27 other contestants to clinch the coveted title. And she also awarded Miss Charity. In addition to winning the title, Anu also received US$10,000 in cash as prize. In this pageant Miss Oyungerel Gankhuyag participated first in 2007 representing Mongolia. Anu wrote on her Facebook page, “My dream came true. I want to express my gratitude to my family, my love, founder of Mongol Model Agency D.Bolormaa, and all Mongolians for always being on my side. I am also very thankful for Precious Fashion House for making all of my dresses. I always wanted to promote Mongolia in the world by being crowned in international competitions. I tried hard to reach my dream. I harvested what I planted. If you have a dream, work on it. If it’s in your heart, then never give up.” 
In October 2016, she traveled around Taiwan such as Pacific Ocean through Miss Tourism Queen International 2016 winner and she participated as guest Golden Horse Film Festival and Awards 2016 in Taipei, Taiwan. From Jan 1, 2017 She flew to Vietnam through Miss Tourism Queen International 2016 winner. During visiting there she was invited to attend at the Press Conference in Ho Chi Minh City for Miss Tourism Queen Vietnam 2017 contest. March 7, 2017, she flew to Vietnam to judge Miss Tourism Vietnam 2017 final contest.

Appearance

Music video

Stage show

TV program

Awards

References

External links
 

1991 births
Miss International 2013 delegates
Miss World 2015 delegates
Living people
Mongolian female models
Mongolian beauty pageant winners
People from Ulaanbaatar
21st-century Mongolian painters
21st-century Mongolian women
21st-century Mongolian artists